Vitalis, Sator and Repositus are a set of early Christian martyrs, killed in Velleianum in Apulia, Italy, possibly in the early 4th century. Their feast day is 29 August.

References

4th-century Christian martyrs